St. Lawrence High School was a coeducational Catholic high school in Utica, Michigan, United States.  It closed in 1971.

References

Defunct Catholic secondary schools in Michigan